Sokatra is an extinct genus of pleurodiran turtle, known from the Cretaceous (Maastrichtian) Maevarano Formation of Madagascar. It belongs to the family Sahonachelyidae.

References 

Pleurodira
Prehistoric turtles